A Refcam (also known as Referee cam or Umpire cam) is a special type of broadcast point-of-view camera used in sports and worn by a referee or umpire during the game.

Usage

Refcams are being used in various sports like american football, ice hockey, field hockey, baseball and other.

See also 

 Helmet camera
 Body camera

References 

Cameras
Cameras by type
Subminiature cameras
Film and video technology
Sports television technology